2015 is the eighth competitive season for the Cairns based Sea Swift Northern Pride Rugby League Football Club. They played in the QRL state competition, the Intrust Super Cup. 14 clubs competed, with each club playing 23 matches (12 home and 11 away) over 25 rounds. In 2015 the Townsville Blackhawks were admitted to the competition.

2015 Season -  Sea Swift Northern Pride

Staff
 Coach: Joe O'Callaghan 
 Assistant coach: Shane O'Flanagan
 Team Co-Captains: Brett Anderson & Jason Roos  
 Trainer: Peter Nash
 Assistant trainer: Deb Gallop
 Physiotherapist: Tim Laycock
 Head Conditioner & High Performance Manager: Ben Fielding
 Strength & Rehab Coordinator: Matthew Di Salvo
 Assistant Strength and Rehab Coordinator: Megan Harding
 Team manager: Alan Marsh 
 Chief Executive: Rod Jensen 
 Chairman: Bob Fowler
 Club director: Tony Williamson

 Competition: Intrust Super Cup

Player awards
 Sea Swift Most improved player - Tom Hancock 
 Sea Swift Members Player of the Year - Sam Obst
 Sea Swift Best Back - Linc Port
 Sea Swift Best Forward - Graham Clark
 Sea Swift Players' Player - Sheldon Powe-Hobbs
 Sea Swift Player of the Year - Jack Svendsen
 John O'Brien Club Person of the Year - Jacqui Clarkson

2015 player gains
 Luke George from Super League Wakefield Trinity Wildcats  and Bradford Bulls 
 Ben Jeffries from Super League Bradford Bulls 
 Vaipuna Tia-Kilifi from NRL Penrith Panthers 
 Sam Pau from NRL North Queensland Cowboys NYC 
 Denzel King from NRL Canterbury Bulldogs NYC 
 Graham Clark from QRL Wynnum Manly Seagulls 
 Regan Verney from CDRL Tully Tigers
 Jared Verney from CDRL Tully Tigers
 Dean McGilvray from CDRL Atherton Roosters
 Bradley Stephen from CDRL Cairns Kangaroos
 Eddie Daniel from CDRL Cairns Brothers
 Travis Peeters from CDRL Cairns Kangaroos
 Nathan Wales from CDRL Edmonton Storm

Player losses after 2014 season
The Northern Pride suffered substantial player losses at the end of the successful 2014 season with four players being contracted to the NRL and two of the North Queensland Cowboys allocated players moving to the Townsville Blackhawks and Joel Riethmuller retiring. In addition, coach J.D. resigned to take up a position as assistant coach at the Cowboys.
  Shaun Nona signed to the NRL Melbourne Storm 
  Blake Leary signed to the NRL Manly Warringah Sea Eagles 
  Ben Spina signed to the NRL North Queensland Cowboys 
  Davin Crampton signed to the NRL Gold Coast Titans 
  Tyrone McCarthy signed to the Super League Hull Kingston Rovers 
  Latu Fifita signed to UK Kingstone Press Championship side Workington Town 
  Ricky Thorby signed to the new Queensland Cup side Townsville Blackhawks 
  Kyle Feldt signed to the new Queensland Cup side Townsville Blackhawks 
  Joel Riethmuller retired.

2015 squad

 Brett Anderson (co-captain) (Centre)

 Semi Tadulala (Wing)

 Sam Obst (Half/Hooker)

 Ryan Ghietti (Halfback)

 Linc Port (Centre)

 Bradley Stephen (Centre)

 Luke George

 Justin Castellaro

 Menmuny Murgha

 Dean McGilvray

 Regan Verney

 Jordan Biondi-Odo

 Jared Allen

 Eddie Daniel

 Sam Pau

 Codey Kennedy

 Jason Roos (co-captain) (Hooker)

 Alex Starmer (Prop)  

 Graham Clark

 Vaipuna Tia Kilifi

 Tom Hancock (Second Row)

 P J Webb

 Brent Oosen

 Jack Svendsen (Second Row)

 Travis Peeters (Prop)

 Nathan Wales (Prop / Lock)

 Sheldon Powe-Hobbs (Lock/Second Row)

 Denzel King

 Maddie Oosen

 Keelan White

 Dave Murphy

 Jared Verney

 Ben Spina

 Hezron Murgha

 Javid Bowen

 Patrick Kafusi

 Cameron King

 Lachlan Coote

 Scott Bolton

 Antonio Winterstein

Broski Emery Hunia

Lachlan Parmenter (Cairns Brothers)

Nathan Curcio (Atherton)

Peter Tognolini

2015 Season Launch
 Cairns Induction Day: Saturday 22 November 2014
 Training for the 2015 season started on Monday 24 November 2014
 2015 Corporate Launch: Friday 20 February 2015, Barlow Park

Pre Season Boot Camp

2015 Jerseys

2015 Sponsors
Naming rights sponsor:
 Sea Swift
Jersey sponsor (back of jersey):
 Sea Swift 
 Brothers Leagues Club, Cairns
 Emu Sportswear
Sleeve sponsor:
 
Shorts sponsor:
 Brothers Leagues Club, Cairns
 Cairns Regional Council
 Fuller Sports
 Intrust Super
 Cairns Hardware
 EMU Sportswear.
Shirt manufacturer:
 EMU Sportswear.
Other sponsors: Castlemaine XXXX; Pacific Toyota; Cairns District Rugby League; Calanna Pharmacy; Tropic Wings; GATA Plastering; All Seasons Cairns Colonial Club; Cairns Plan Printing; Yalumba Winery.
Media partners: Sea FM; WIN Television; Cairns Post.

Trial Matches

Intrust Super Cup matches

2015 Ladder

Finals Series

2015 Northern Pride players

North Queensland Cowboys who played for the Northern Pride in 2015

2015 Televised Games

Channel Nine
In August 2012 as part of the historic $1 billion five-year broadcasting agreement with Nine and Fox Sports, the Australian Rugby League Commission confirmed that Intrust Super Cup matches would be televised by Channel 9 until 2018. One match a week is shown live across Queensland at 2.00pm (AEST) on Sunday afternoons on Channel 9 (or GEM), on WIN Television (RTQ) in regional areas and on Imparja Television in remote areas. The match is also broadcast in Papua New Guinea on Kundu 2 TV. The 2015 commentary team is Peter Psaltis, Scott Sattler and Mathew Thompson.
 2015 Northern Pride televised games - Channel 9, WIN Television (RTQ), Imparja Television and Kundu 2 TV.
 1: Easts Tigers beat Northern Pride 20-12: Round 1, Sunday, 8 March 2015, 1.40 pm from Tap Out Energy Stadium, Stones Corner, Brisbane. This match was shown on the Nine Network's GEM channel because the ICC World Cup Cricket match between Australia and Sri Lanka was on Channel Nine.
 x: Northern Pride v Townsville Blackhawks: Round 3, Sunday, 22 March 2015, 1.50 pm from Barlow Park, Cairns. This game was reallocated as a result of weather concerns due to Cyclone Nathan and the match between Tweed Heads Seagulls and Norths Devils was shown instead.
 2: Northern Pride beat Souths Logan Magpies 36-18: Round 8, Sunday, 26 April 2015, 12.30 pm (telecast delayed to 1.30 pm) from Barlow Park, Cairns. This Round was originally scheduled as the Wynnum Manly Seagulls v Norths Devils game.
 3: Ipswich Jets beat Northern Pride 54-26: Finals Week 1, First Elimination Semi-final, Sunday 6 September 2015, 1.35 pm from North Ipswich Reserve, Ipswich.

References

External links
 Northern Pride Official site
 Northern Pride Facebook Page
 Northern Pride Twitter Page
 Northern Pride YouTube Page
 2012 Northern Pride match highlights on YouTube

Northern Pride RLFC seasons
2015 in Australian rugby league
2015 in rugby league by club